Marcel Georges Lucien Grandjany (3 September 1891 – 24 February 1975) was a French-American harpist and composer.

Biography

Early life
Marcel Grandjany was born in Paris and began the study of the harp at the age of eight with Henriette Renié. At age eleven, he was admitted to the Conservatoire de Paris, where he studied with Alphonse Hasselmans, winning the coveted Premier Prix at age thirteen.

Career
At seventeen he made his debut with the Concerts Lamoureux Orchestra, and gave his first solo recital, winning immediate acclaim. He appeared with Maurice Ravel in Paris in 1913. His London debut was in 1922 and his New York debut in 1924. He appeared as soloist with major orchestras under the direction of Gabriel Pierné, Alfred Cortot, Walter Damrosch, Serge Koussevitzky, George Szell, Fritz Reiner and Vladimir Golschmann, among others.

From 1921 to 1926, he headed  the harp department of the Fontainebleau Summer School. He moved to the United States in 1936 and was appointed head of the Harp Department at the Juilliard School in 1938, where he taught until his death in 1975. In 1943 he was chosen to organize the harp department of the Conservatoire de musique et d'art dramatique à Montréal, and for the next twenty years he traveled monthly from New York to Montréal. He was also head of the harp department at the Manhattan School of Music from 1956 to 1967. Notable students include American harpists Nancy Allen, Catherine Gotthoffer, and Eileen Malone. He also taught Anna Clark, the second wife of William A. Clark; she was also his patron.

At the First International Harp Contest in Israel in 1959, Pierre Jamet of France proposed the formation of an international association of harpists. Grandjany undertook to see what he could do in the United States and chaired a committee of leading harpists. The Founding Committee met for the first time on 3 December 1962 in his apartment at 235 W. 71 St, Apartment 32. Over the years, he was a member of the Board of Directors, Regional Director, Chapter Chairman and President of the New York Chapter. He generously performed at AHS conferences; in 1964 at the first conference and in 1967, a solo recital which was his last public performance. He supported the educational goals of the Society vigorously and delighted in the American Harp Society's growth and community. He died in New York City.

Selected works
Concertante
 Rhapsodie on a Theme of a Gregorian Easter Chant for harp and orchestra (flute, oboe, clarinet, horn and strings), Op. 10 (1921)
 Aria in Classic Style for harp and organ (or orchestra), Op. 19
 Poème symphonique for harp, horn and orchestra

Harp
 Trois petites pièces très faciles (3 Very Easy Little Pieces), Op. 7
   Rêverie
   Nocturne
   Barcarolle
 Rhapsodie (op.10)
 Dans la forêt du charme et de l'enchantement, Conte de fée (Fairy Tale), Op. 11 (1922)
 Pièce romantique for piano, Op. 15
 Les enfants jouent (Children at Play), Op. 16 
 Souvenirs, Poème, Op. 17
 Variation on the Londonderry Air, Op. 20
 Bagatelles, Op. 22
 Old Chinese Song, Op. 23
 Noël provençal, Op. 24
 Children's Hour, Suite, Op. 25
 Two Duets for 2 harps, Op. 26
   Sally and Dinny Duet
   Eleanor and Marcia Duet
 Harp Album, Op. 27
   Greetings
   Zephyr
   In Dancing Mood
   A Butterfly
   Deep River Interlude for 3 harps
   The Pageant Begins
   On a Western Ranch
   Through the Meadows
 The Colorado Trail, Fantaisie, Op. 28
 Divertissement, Op. 29
   Canon
   Fughetta
   Final
 Fantaisie sur un thème de J. Haydn, Op. 31 (1958)
 Frère Jacques, Fantaisie, Op. 32
 The Erie Canal, Fantasy, Op. 38
 Fileuse, Op. 39
 Les cerisiers en fleurs (Cherry Blossoms), Op. 41
 Arabesque pour harpe sans pédales, No. 1 from Trois pièces pour le piano
 Automne, Pièce pour harpe (1927)
 Deux chansons populaires françaises, Easy Pieces
   Le bon petit roi d'Yvetôt
   Et ron ron ron, petit patapon
 4 Études
   Legato
   Phrasing
   4th Finger
   Rhythm
 Impromptu pour harpe sans pédales, No. 3 from Trois pièces pour le piano
 Les agneaux dansent (Dancing Lambs) for harp with or without pedals 
 Little Harp Book, 8 Easy Solos for harp with or without pedals
 Pastorale pour harpe sans pédales, No. 2 from Trois pièces pour le piano
 Petite suite classique
   Joyful Overture: In the Style of Purcell
   Gigue: Remembrance of Kuhnau
   Gavotte: Reverence to Lully
   Siciliana: Aeolian Mode
   Passepied: Homage to the Couperins
   Bourrée: In the Style of Handel
 3 Préludes
 Trois pièces faciles (3 Easy Pieces)
 Variations on a Prelude of J.S. Bach (1965?); after BWV 872a

Transcriptions for harp solo
 J.S. Bach - Etudes for Harp selected and transcribed from Bach's violin partitas and sonatas
 J.S. Bach - "Gigue & Preambulum, Corrente & Minuetto" selected and transcribed from Bach's Clavier partitas 1 & 5
 J.S. Bach - Praeludium transcribed from Bach's Well tempered Clavier Book 1
 J.S. Bach – Allemande
 John Bull – The King's Hunt
 François Couperin – La commère
 Manuel de Falla - Spanish Dance 1
 Antoine Francisque – Pavane et bransles from Le Trésor d'Orphée
 George Frideric Handel – Prelude and Toccata, HWV 568, 475; Saraband (HWV 455); "Concerto en si bémol & cadence originale", 1933
 Gottfried Kirchhoff – Aria and Rigaudon
 Jean-Baptiste Loeillet – Toccata
 Giovanni Battista Sammartini – Allegretto
 Franz Schubert - Ave Maria
 Ottorino Respighi - Siciliana
 Traditional [sic] – On an Old Christmas Song: "Silent Night, Holy Night" (actually by Franz Xaver Gruber and Joseph Mohr)

Vocal
 O bien aimée for voice (or melody instrument) and harp; words by Paul Verlaine

References

External links
 

Musicians from Paris
1891 births
1975 deaths
20th-century classical composers
American classical harpists
American male classical composers
American classical composers
French classical harpists
Composers for harp
Academic staff of the Conservatoire de musique du Québec à Montréal
Juilliard School faculty
Manhattan School of Music faculty
20th-century American composers
20th-century French composers
20th-century American male musicians
French male classical composers
French emigrants to the United States